Rajanaka Kṣemarāja (क्षेमराज) (late 10th to early 11th century) was a philosopher and brilliant disciple of Abhinavagupta, who was a peerless master of tantra, yoga, poetics, and dramaturgy. Not much is known of Kṣemarāja's life or parentage. His chief disciple was a sage known as Yogāraja. The Pratyabhijnahridayam, a work in which Kṣemarāja brings the main tenets of the Pratyabhijna system into a succinct set of sutras for those who may not have studied in-depth metaphysics, occupies the same place in Kashmir Shaivite or Trika literature as Vedanta Sara does in Vedanta. Other works of his: Spandasandoha, Spandanirnaya, Svacchandodyota, Netrodyota, Vijnanabhairavodyota, Shivasutravimarsini, Stavacintamanitika, Parapraveshika, Tattvasandoha."Man bound in all the phases of waking, dream and dreamless sleep by the body, prana, pleasure, etc. does not recognize his own consciousness which is of the nature of the great power and full of perfect bliss." -- Kṣemarāja

See also 
 Abhinavagupta
 Vasugupta
 Somananda
 Utpalacarya
 Kundalini
 Yoga

References

Further reading
 

Kashmiri writers
10th-century Indian people
11th-century Indian people
Year of death unknown
Year of birth unknown
Kashmir Shaivism